Jean-Louis Charles Huré (17 September 1877 – 27 January 1930) was a French composer and organist. Though educated in music at a monastery in Angers, he was mostly self-taught.

Life
Born in Gien, Loiret, Huré studied anthropology, composition, improvisation and medieval music at the École Saint-Maurille in Angers and served as organist at the cathedral in the city. In 1895 he moved to Paris, where he was advised by Charles-Marie Widor and Charles Koechlin to study at the Conservatory. Huré preferred to live an independent life.
 
From 1910 he taught at the École Normale Supérieure, where Yves Nat and Manuel Rosenthal were among his students. In 1911 he helped found the Paris Mozart Society; he was also a member of the short-lived Association des Compositeurs Bretons during 1912–14. He worked as organist at the churches of Notre-Dame-des-Blancs-Manteaux, Saint-Martin-des-Champs and Saint-Séverin between 1911 and 1914. From 1924 he was appointed successor to Lucien Grandjany at Sacré-Cœur and from 1926 as the successor to Eugene Gigout at Saint-Augustin. Between 1924 and 1926 he edited and published a monthly journal called L'Orgue et les Organistes. Huré died in Paris.
 
In addition to a number of organ works Huré composed a comic opera and a ballet, three symphonies and chamber works. In 2010 a CD with works by Huré was recorded, featuring a four-movement sonata for violin and piano and a piano quintet performed by the Quatuor Louvigny and pianist Marie-Josephe Jude.

He died in Paris in 1930.

Works
Stage
 Te Deum: extrait de Jeanne d'Arc, poème théâtral (1895); words by A. Vincent
 La Cathédrale (1910)
 Au bois sacré, Ballet in 1 act (1921)
 Le Rajah de Mysore, Operetta

Orchestral
 Symphony No. 1 (1896)
 Symphony No. 2 (1897)
 Symphony No. 3 (1903)
 Poèmes enfantins for chamber orchestra (1906)
Nocturne (Paris: A.Z. Mathot, 1908)
 Prélude symphonique for orchestra

Concertante
 Air for violin or cello and orchestra (1902)
 Nocturne for piano and orchestra (1903)
 Andante for alto saxophone, string orchestra, harp, timpani and organ (1915)
 Concertstück for saxophone and orchestra
 Concerto for cello and orchestra (1929)
 Concerto for violin and orchestra

Chamber music
 Suite sur des Chants bretons for violin, cello and piano or harp (1898; Paris: A.Z. Mathot, 1913)
 Sonata in C minor for violin and piano (1900–1901)
 Petite chanson for cello (or viola) and piano (1901)
 Air in F major for cello and piano or organ (1901)
 Sonata No. 1 in F minor for cello and piano (1903; Paris: A. Z. Mathot, 1914)
 Sonata for violin and piano (c. 1905)
 Sonata No. 2 in F major for cello and piano (1906)
 Sonatine in G major for violin and piano (1907; Paris: A.Z. Mathot, 1909)
 Piano Quintet (1907–08; Paris: A.Z. Mathot, 1914)
 Sonata No. 3 in F major for cello and piano (1909)
 String Quartet No. 1 in C major (1913–1917)
 Prélude for violin (or cello) and organ
 Sérénade en trio for violin, cello and piano (1920)
 Sonata for violin and piano (1920)
 String Quartet No. 2 (Paris: M. Sénart, 1921)
 Sonata No. 4 for cello and piano (1924)

Organ
 Interlude-élévation for organ or harmonium (1911)
 Communion pour une Messe de Minuit à Noël (Communion on a Noel: Offertory for Midnight Mass) (1913)
 Prélude pour une messe Pontificale (1915)

Piano
 Poèmes Enfantin (1906)
 Jacques et Jacqueline (Paris: A. Z. Mathot, ca 1910; Musica, July 1912, Pierre Lafitte et Cie)
 Sonata No. 1 in F minor for piano (or harp) (1907; Paris: A. Z. Mathot, 1913)
 Sonata No. 2 (1916)

Vocal
 Élégie for voice, cello and piano (Paris: A. Z. Mathot, 1905); words by René de Brédenbec
 Te Deum for soprano, chorus and organ (Paris: A. Z. Mathot, 1907)
 Sept chantons de Bretagne for voice and piano (Paris: A. Z. Mathot, 1910)
 Ave Maria for 2 female voices (1924; Paris: Éditions musicales de la Schola cantorum et de la Procure générale de musique, 1956)
 L'Âme en peine for 4 voices (1925)
 4 Lettres de femmes for voice and piano (1928)
 4 Poèmes for voice and piano (1929); words by Arnould Grémilly
 Trois Chansons monodiques for solo voice (1930); words by André Spire
 Belle, j'entends bien tourner la meule du moulin for voice and chamber orchestra

Literary
 Chansons et danses bretonnes précédées d'une étude sur la monodie populaire (Angers, 1902)
 Dogmes musicaux (Le Monde musical, Paris, 1909)
 Technique du piano (Paris, 1909)
 Introduction à la technique du piano (Paris, 1910)
 Défense et illustration de la musique française (Angers, 1915)
 La Technique de l'orgue (Paris, 1918)
 L'Esthétique de l'orgue (Paris: Sénart, 1923)
 Saint Augustin musicien (Paris: Sénart, 1924)

Bibliography
Georges Migot: Jean Huré (Paris: Sénart, 1926)
Jean Bonfils: Jean Huré (Kassel: Bärenreiter, 1957)

References

Attribution
 This article is based on a translation of the corresponding article of the German Wikipedia. A list of contributors can be found there at History.

External links
 Works by Jean Huré at the International Music Score Library Project.

1877 births
1930 deaths
20th-century classical composers
French classical organists
French male organists
20th-century French musicologists
French classical composers
French male classical composers
People from Gien
Deaths from pneumonia in France
20th-century French composers
20th-century French male musicians
Male classical organists